Brigitte van der Lans (born 28 July 1968 in Hoevelaken) is a Dutch former backstroke swimmer, who competed at the 1984 Olympics in Los Angeles. She finished 12th in the 100 metre backstroke and 17th in the 200 metre backstroke, the latter of which was won by her teammate Jolanda de Rover. She also participated at the 1985 European Aquatics Championships in Sofia, Bulgaria.

References

1968 births
Living people
People from Nijkerk
Dutch female backstroke swimmers
Olympic swimmers of the Netherlands
Swimmers at the 1984 Summer Olympics
Sportspeople from Gelderland
20th-century Dutch women